The 8th Aerobic Gymnastics European Championships was held in Arques, France  November 4–10, 2013.

Championships was also qualification event for 2015 European Games in mixed pairs and groups.

Results

Medal table

Participating nations 

 (2)
 (2)
 (15)
 (5)
 (11)
 (3)
 (8)

 (1)
 (28)
 (1)
 (16)
 (1)
 (3)
 (9)

 (11)
 (24)
 (11)
 (2)
 (1)
 (1)
 (29)

Countries that competed only in Junior events: .

References

External links
Official website

2013
2013 in gymnastics
International gymnastics competitions hosted by France
2013 in French sport